Robert W. "Bud" Moore (born October 16, 1939) is an American former college football player and coach. He served as the head coach at the University of Kansas from 1975 to 1978, compiling a record of 18–26–1. In his first season in 1975, Moore was named Big Eight Coach of the Year and was runner-up to Woody Hayes of Ohio State as the Football Writers Association of America National Coach of the Year. Moore led his team to a 23–3 upset over eventual national champion Oklahoma, breaking the Sooners' 37-game unbeaten streak and handing coach Barry Switzer his first loss. 

The Jayhawks switched to the wishbone formation when Moore came to Lawrence. Kansas' wishbone was piloted by quarterback Nolan Cromwell, who was named 1975 Big Eight Offensive Player of the Year and later went on to an 11-year Pro Bowl career as a defensive back with the Los Angeles Rams. 

In 1976, the Jayhawks started 4-0 and were ranked 8th in the AP poll (the last time they would be ranked in 17 years), but after QB Cromwell suffered a season-ending knee injury against Oklahoma, KU finished 6–5. Moore was the first KU coach with back-to-back winning seasons since Jack Mitchell in 1961-62, but this success was followed by 4–6–1 in 1977 and then 1–10 in 1978. In spite of dominating rivals Missouri and Kansas State, these struggles, failure to improve facilities, plus lagging attendance, led to Moore's firing as head coach after four seasons.

A native of Birmingham, Alabama and a graduate of the University of Alabama, Moore played football and coached for the Crimson Tide under Bear Bryant, serving as Bryant's first offensive coordinator in 1974. He also was an assistant under Charlie Bradshaw at the University of Kentucky, Gene Stallings at Texas A&M University, and Bill Dooley at the University of North Carolina at Chapel Hill. He received the Paul W. Bryant Alumni-Athlete Award in 1995. The award is given to a former University of Alabama athlete in recognition of character, contribution to society, professional achievement, and service to fellow man. Moore is a member of the University of Kansas Athletics Hall of Fame, and in 2019 was inducted into the Alabama Sports Hall of Fame.

After retiring from coaching, Moore entered private business. In 1994, he was honored on National Philanthropy Day by the West Florida chapter of the Association of Fundraising Professionals. He has been active in bird dog field trials and showing Tennessee Walking Horses, having raised and owned multiple national champions in both venues.

Head coaching record

References

1939 births
Living people
American football ends
Alabama Crimson Tide football coaches
Alabama Crimson Tide football players
Kansas Jayhawks football coaches
Kentucky Wildcats football coaches
North Carolina Tar Heels football coaches
Texas A&M Aggies football coaches
Sportspeople from Birmingham, Alabama
Players of American football from Birmingham, Alabama